Michael or Mike McCormick may refer to:

Michael McCormick (actor) (born 1951), American theatre actor
Michael E. McCormick, professor
Mike McCormick (third baseman) (1882–1953), American baseball player
Mike McCormick (outfielder) (1917–1976), American baseball player
Mike McCormick (pitcher) (1938–2020), American baseball player
Mike McCormick, singer with Canadian band The Arrogant Worms

See also
Michael McCormack (disambiguation)